The 2022 United States House of Representatives elections in Missouri were held on November 8, 2022, to elect the eight U.S. representatives from the state of Missouri, one from each of the state's congressional districts. The elections coincided with other elections to the House of Representatives, elections to the United States Senate, and various state and local elections.

This was the first House of Representatives elections held in Missouri following the 2020 redistricting cycle. The associated primary elections were held on August 2, 2022.

District 1

The 1st district encompasses the city of St. Louis and much of northern St. Louis County, including Florissant and University City. The incumbent is Democrat Cori Bush, who was elected with 78.8% of the vote in 2020 after defeating the incumbent, Lacy Clay, in the Democratic primary.

Democratic primary

Candidates

Nominee
Cori Bush, incumbent U.S. Representative

Eliminated in primary
Earl Childress, pastor
Michael Daniels, former aide to St. Louis mayor Freeman Bosley Jr.
Ron Harshaw, assistant high school football coach
Steve Roberts, state senator for the 5th district

Withdrew 

 David Koehr, Republican candidate for this district in 2014

Endorsements

Polling

Results

Republican primary

Candidates

Nominee
Andrew Jones, utility executive, nominee for mayor of St. Louis in 2017, and candidate in 2021

Eliminated in primary
Steven Jordan
Laura Mitchell-Riley

Results

Libertarian primary

Candidates

Nominee 
 George A. Zsidisin, professor and author

Results

General election

Predictions

Results

District 2

The 2nd district is based in eastern Missouri, and includes the southern and western suburbs of St. Louis, including Arnold, Town and Country, Wildwood, Chesterfield, and Oakville. The incumbent is Republican Ann Wagner, who was re-elected with 51.9% of the vote in 2020.

Republican primary

Candidates

Nominee
Ann Wagner, incumbent U.S. Representative

Eliminated in primary
Paul Berry III, 2018 and 2020 Republican nominee for St. Louis County Executive
Tony Salvatore
Wesley Smith, U.S. Army veteran

Endorsements

Results

Democratic primary

Candidates

Nominee
Trish Gunby, state representative

Eliminated in primary
Ray Reed, political organizer

Withdrew 

 Ben Samuels, former director of special projects for Massachusetts Governor Charlie Baker

Endorsements

Results

Libertarian primary

Candidates

Nominee

 Bill Slantz, consulting firm executive

Results

General election

Predictions

Results

District 3

The third district encompasses east-central Missouri, taking in Jefferson City, Troy, O'Fallon, and Washington. The incumbent is Republican Blaine Luetkemeyer, who was re-elected with 69.4% of the vote in 2020.

Republican primary

Candidates

Nominee
Blaine Luetkemeyer, incumbent U.S. Representative

Eliminated in primary
Dustin Hill
Richard Skwira Jr.
Brandon Wilkinson, truck driver and candidate for this seat in 2020

Withdrew 

 Josh Ciskowski

Endorsements

Results

Democratic primary

Candidates

Nominee
Bethany Mann

Eliminated in primary
Andrew Daly, director of the Missouri School for the Deaf Activities
Dylan Durrwachter
Jon Karlen

Withdrawn
Josh Nicoloff, audit manager

Results

General election

Predictions

Results

District 4

The 4th district is based in predominantly rural west-central Missouri, taking in Columbia, Sedalia, Warrensburg, and Lebanon. The incumbent is Republican Vicky Hartzler, who was re-elected with 67.6% of the vote in 2020. Hartzler chose not to run for re-election and instead ran for U.S. Senate.

Republican primary

Candidates

Nominee
Mark Alford, former news anchor at WDAF-TV

Eliminated in primary
Rick Brattin, state senator
Kalena Bruce, cattle farmer
Taylor Burks, former Boone County Clerk
Jim Campbell, former professional ice hockey player
Bill Irwin, retired Navy Seal Captain and former Lee's Summit Police Officer
Kyle LaBrue, land developer

Deceased 
Ed Emery, former state senator (Died August 6, 2021)

Withdrew 
 Ryan Johnson, Cass County commissioner
 Sara Walsh, state representative

Declined
Sandy Crawford, state senator (running for re-election)
Vicky Hartzler, incumbent U.S. Representative (running for U.S. senate)
Caleb Rowden, Majority Leader of the Missouri Senate

Endorsements

Polling

Results

Democratic primary

Candidates

Nominee
Jack Truman, candidate for this district in 2016

Results

Libertarian primary

Candidates

Nominee

 Randy Langkraehr

Results

General election

Predictions

Results

District 5

The 5th district primarily consists of the inner ring of the Kansas City metropolitan area, including nearly all of Kansas City south of the Missouri River. The incumbent is Democrat Emanuel Cleaver, who was re-elected with 58.8% of the vote in 2020.

Democratic primary

Candidates

Nominee
Emanuel Cleaver, incumbent U.S. Representative

Eliminated in primary
Maite Salazar, progressive activist and candidate for Missouri's 5th congressional district in 2020

Endorsements

Republican primary

Candidates

Nominee
Jacob Turk, perennial candidate for this seat in 2006, 2008, 2010, 2012, 2014, 2016, and 2018

Eliminated in primary
Jerry Barham, candidate for this district in 2020
Herschel L. Young, former Cass County Commissioner and perennial candidate

Results

Libertarian primary

Candidates

Nominee
Robin Dominick, truck driver and nominee for this district in 2020

Results

General election

Predictions

Results

District 6

The 6th district encompasses rural northern Missouri, St. Joseph and much of Kansas City north of the Missouri River. The incumbent is Republican Sam Graves, who was re-elected with 67.1% of the vote in 2020.

Republican primary

Candidates

Nominee
Sam Graves, incumbent U.S. Representative

Eliminated in primary
John Dady
Brandon Kleinmeyer, tax preparer
Christopher Ryan, perennial candidate
Dakota Shultz, software developer

Results

Democratic primary

Candidates

Nominee
Henry Martin, U.S. Army veteran and candidate for this district in 2020

Eliminated in primary
Michael Howard
Charles West, Clark County school board member and candidate for this district in 2020

Results

Libertarian primary

Candidates

Nominee

 Edward A (Andy) Maidment U.S. Army veteran and Computer security professional

Results

General election

Predictions

Results

District 7

The 7th district is located in southwestern Missouri, taking in Springfield, Joplin, Branson, and Nixa. The incumbent was Republican Billy Long, who had been re-elected with 68.9% of the vote in 2020. Long chose not to run for re-election and instead ran for U.S. senate.

Republican primary

Candidates

Nominee
Eric Burlison, state senator

Eliminated in primary
Sam Alexander, physician
Alex Bryant, minister
Camille Lombardi-Olive, candidate for this district in 2020 and Missouri's 1st congressional district in 2018
Mike Moon, state senator
Audrey Richards, nonprofit consultant and independent write-in candidate for this district in 2020
Jay Wasson, former mayor of Nixa and former state senator
Paul Walker

Declined
Bob Dixon, Greene County Presiding Commissioner and former state senator
Tim Garrison, former United States Attorney for the Western District of Missouri
Elijah Haahr, former Speaker of the Missouri House of Representatives
Lincoln Hough, state senator (running for re-election)
Billy Long, incumbent U.S. Representative (running for U.S. senate)
Gary Nodler, former state senator
Ron Richard, former state senator and former Speaker of the Missouri House of Representatives
Cody Smith, state representative
Bill White, state senator

Endorsements

Polling

Results

Democratic primary

Candidates

Nominee 
 Kristen Radaker-Sheafer, business owner

Eliminated in primary 
 Bryce F. Lockwood
 John M. Woodman, business owner

Results

Libertarian primary

Candidates

Nominee 
Kevin Craig, founder of a Christian anarchist group and perennial candidate

Results

General election

Predictions

Results

District 8

The 8th district is the most rural district of Missouri, taking in rural southeastern Missouri, including the Missouri Bootheel, as well as the cities of Cape Girardeau and Poplar Bluff. The incumbent is Republican Jason Smith, who was re-elected with 76.9% of the vote in 2020.

Republican primary

Candidates

Nominee
Jason Smith, incumbent U.S. Representative

Eliminated in primary
Jacob Turner

Endorsements

Results

Democratic primary

Candidates

Nominee

 Randi McCallian

Results

Libertarian primary

Candidates

Nominee
 Jim Higgins, perennial candidate

Results

General election

Predictions

Results

See also 
 2022 Missouri elections

Notes

Partisan clients

References

External links
 
 
  (State affiliate of the U.S. League of Women Voters)
 

Official campaign websites for 1st district candidates
 Cori Bush (D) for Congress
 Andrew Jones (R) for Congress

Official campaign websites for 2nd district candidates
 Trish Gunby (D) for Congress
 Ann Wagner (R) for Congress

Official campaign websites for 3rd district candidates
 Blaine Luetkemeyer (R) for Congress

Official campaign websites for 4th district candidates
 Mark Alford (R) for Congress

Official campaign websites for 5th district candidates
 Emanuel Cleaver (D) for Congress
 Rob Dominick (L) for Congress

Official campaign websites for 6th district candidates
 Sam Graves (R) for Congress
 Henry Martin (D) for Congress 
 Edward A (Andy) Maidment (L) for Congress

Official campaign websites for 7th district candidates
Eric Burlison (R) for Congress
Kevin Craig (L) for Congress

Official campaign websites for 8th district candidates
Jason Smith (R) for Congress

2022
Missouri
United States House of Representatives